Imma bifulminata is a moth of the family Immidae. It is found on Sulawesi.

References

Immidae
Moths described in 1930
Moths of Indonesia
Taxa named by Edward Meyrick